(J. 8, Op. 8, Peter Schmoll and his Neighbours) is the third opera by Carl Maria von Weber and the first for which the music has survived, though the libretto has not. It was written in 1801–2 when the composer was only 15 and premiered in Augsburg the following year. The libretto is based on a novel by Carl Gottlob Cramer.

Roles
 The cook (contralto)	 
 Hans Bast (bass)	
 Karl Pirkner (tenor)	
 Martin Schmoll (baritone)	
 Minette (soprano)	
 Niklas (tenor)	
 Peter Schmoll (bass)

Recording
Peter Schmoll und seine Nachbarn Busching/Schmidt/Pfeffer, Hagen Philharmonic Orchestra, Gerhard Markson (Marco Polo, 1994)

References

Sources

 Holden, Amanda, ed. The New Penguin Opera Guide, New York: Penguin Putnam, Inc., 2001 

 Warrack, John, Review of the Markson recording, Gramophone, September 1994.

 

 

German-language operas
Operas by Carl Maria von Weber
Operas
Operas based on novels